Serhiy Kravchenko may refer to:
Serhiy Kravchenko (footballer, born 1956), Ukrainian footballer
Serhiy Kravchenko (footballer, born 1983), Ukrainian footballer, graduate of Shakhtar football academy and footballer of FC Dnipro
Serhiy Kravchenko (footballer, born 1990), Ukrainian footballer, graduate of the School of Olympic Reserve Donetsk and footballer of FC Helios Kharkiv